Agon Channel was a private television station from Tirana, Albania, launched on 5 April 2013 by Italian businessman Francesco Becchetti. The Italian version of Agon Channel was launched in December 2014 on the Italian digital terrestrial television network with  channel slot 33, as a sister channel of the Albanian Agon Channel. Agon was available in two languages; Albanian and Italian. Italian celebrities such as Simona Ventura, Pupo, Maddalena Corvaglia and Sabrina Ferilli were associated with the station along with Albanian personalities such as Sonila Meço, Adi Krasta, Saimir Kodra, Gentian Zenelaj, Mimoza Picari and Menada Zaimi.

Agon Channel shut down on 10 October 2015. Francesco Becchetti, the owner of the channel and his mother, Liliana Condomitti were accused and wanted for money laundering. Francesco Becchetti's assets were frozen, and Agon Channel was unable to continue.

References 

Defunct television networks in Albania
Television channels and stations established in 2013
Mass media in Tirana

Television channels and stations disestablished in 2015